Brian Ouko Omollo, (born 12 June 1990) popularly known by his stage name Khaligraph Jones and often referred to as Papa Jones, is a Kenyan rapper known for his hit singles "Mazishi" and "Yego". He released his debut full-length studio album Testimony 1990 in June 2018.

Early life 
Jones was born and raised in Kayole, a neighborhood in Nairobi, Kenya.

His mother gave him the name Ouko Robert in honor of the late Kenyan politician Dr. Robert Ouko, who was assassinated on 13 February 1990.

Career 
Khaligraph started his musical career while still in elementary school. He officially began his career in 2008 at a function called "Words And Pictures."

He won Channel O Music Video Awards Emcee Africa in 2009, a highly visible competition that catapulted him to international acclaim almost instantly.

In June 2018, he released his debut full-length studio album dubbed "Testimony 1990".

He was crowned "Best Rap Act of the Year" at the fifth Annual African Muzik Magazine Awards 2018 (Afrimma) held at House of Blues in Dallas, Texas in 2018.

He was named the best Hip Hop act at the Soundcity MVP Awards in January 2020. The ceremony took place at the Eko Convention Center in Lagos, Nigeria.

In 2020 he was nominated for the BET Awards. His nomination was for the Best International Flow category. He was up against South Africa's Nasty C, Brazil's DJonga, Ivorian Kaaris and eventual winner, grime rapper Stormzy from the UK. In May 2021 he was named the East African Rapper of the Year at  MTN Uganda.

In 2021, Khaligraph partnered with Odibets, a sports betting company under their Odimtaani initiative to launch the ‘OdiNare’ rap challenge. This challenge led to a collaboration of Jones with Kenyan rapper Chepkosgei that was executive produced by Riverstarz Music Entertainment.

Discography

Albums

Testimony 1990 

Khaligraph released his debut studio album Testimony 1990 in June 2018. Testimony 1990 is a testimony of his life, his troubles and those of his country Kenya.

Track listing 
 "Testimony" ft. Sagini
 "Blessings"
 "For Life"
 "G Like That"
 "Gwala" ft. YCEE
 "Making Babies"
 "Taking It All" ft. Timmy Blanco
 "Instagram Girls"
 "No Change" ft. Fena* "Aiseee" ft. Ray C
 "Superwoman" ft. Mr Eazi
 "All The Way Up"
 "Now You Know" ft. Rostam
 "Beat It"
 "Go Hard" ft. Esco
 "Don Know" ft. K.O
 "Complicated" ft Ria

Invisible Currency 
Khaligraph Jones released his 2nd Album was first released on 7th March 2022 exclusively on Boomplay streaming service. It accumulated a total of 1 Million Streams in Six days on the streaming platform. He later released it on other streaming platforms on 13th March 2022.

Track listing 
 "Invisible Currency"
 "All I Need"
 "Ikechukwu"
 "Rada Safi"
 "Ateri Dala" ft. Prince Indah
 "Am on the Move" ft. Blackway
 "Maombi Ya Mama" ft. Adasa
 "Kamnyweso" ft. Mejja
 "Wanguvu" ft. Ali Kiba
 "Inner Peace" ft. Kev the Topic
 "Tsunami" ft. Scar
 "How We Do" ft. Xenia Manasseh
 "Ride for You" ft. Rudeboy
 "Bad Dreams"
 "Flee"
 "Hiroshima" ft. Dax
 "The Khali Chronicles"

Singles 

|-
|2023
|"Kwame" Ft  Harmonize
|}

References

Further reading 
 Khaligraph Jones: How I made it in hip hop

1990 births
Living people
Kenyan rappers
Musicians from Nairobi